Droners is a French animated series that premiered on October 19, 2020. The series is produced by Cyber Group Studios, La Chouette Compagnie and Supamonks Studio, with the participation of TF1, WDR ARD and The Walt Disney Company France, in association with Sofitvcine 6, Sofitvcine 7 and Pictanovo.

Plot
Droners takes place in the world of Terraqua – which is 95% covered by water. Team Tiki – Corto, Mouse, Enki, and Oro – need to win the Whale Cup, the most intense drone racing competition of all time. They'll compete against other teams of teenagers from all over the world, flying their G.E.N.I.E.-powered drones through dangerous territory and avoiding even more dangerous creatures. But failure isn't an option for Team Tiki: the fate of their home, Nuï, relies on their victory!

Characters

Main
 Corto Heilani (Anaïs Delva) is the main character and the pilot for the Tikis. She's hardheaded and confident and a talented pilot who would do anything to save their home of Nuï. She has a crush on Sun. She is 13
 Mouse Anemone Jacintha Ruto is the mechanic for the Tikis. She's also a Shore Scrubber and a part of the Ruto Clan. She is 10
 Enki aka Gabriel Bismuth-Bienaimé is the 13-year-old enginerd for the Tikis. He was at least partially raised in the jungle. He has a crush on Flora.
 Oro is the G.E.N.I.E. for the Tikis. He powers the drone Maroro. In ghost years he is 25.

Recurring

WhaleCorp
 Wyatt Whale is the owner and founder of WhaleCorp, a tech manufacturing company that creates drones and uses/creates G.E.N.I.E.s to power them. He's also financing the drone racing competition and promises an internship to the winning team.
 Neptune is the G.E.N.I.E. for Wyatt Whale.

Team Pirate
 Shark is the pilot (and occasional enginerd) for the Pirates. All three members of the Pirates are Shore Scrubbers.
 Max is the enginerd (and occasional pilot) for the Pirates.
 Ed is the mechanic for the Pirates.
 Patch is the G.E.N.I.E. for the Pirates. He powers the drone Claw.

Team Starfish
 Deejay is the pilot for the Starfih. His age is 17.
Eventually Sun and Corto get together and will make a family. In the familt there will be five sisters and sixty-nine brothers.
 Debbie is the mechanic/enginerd for the Starfish. Her age is 14.
 Shiny is the G.E.N.I.E. for the Starfish. She powers the drone Aquablaster.hey

Team Mirage
 Hannah is the pilot for the Mirages. Their drone is part of Teach Tech and it's called Fatamorgana.
 Adam is the mechanic/enginerd for the Mirages. They're working directly for Gavinda Teach, who has asked them to help her uncover to secrets of G.E.N.I.E.s so she can destroy WhaleCorp.

The Tao Twins
 Sun is the pilot for the Tao Twins. He's blind and has a crush on Corto.
 Monk is the mechanic/enginerd for the Tao Twins.
 Lotus is the G.E.N.I.E. for the Tao Twins. They power the drone Wushu.

Team Bee
 Flora (Leslie Lipkins) is the pilot for the Bees. She has a crush on Enki.
 Fuzz is the enginerd for the Bees.
 Buzz is the mechanic for the Bees.
 Jelly is the G.E.N.I.E. for the Bees. They power the drone Bumblebee.

Team Siren
 Mina (Leslie Lipkins) is the pilot for the Sirens. Her age is 13.
 Victoria is the engineered for the Sirens.Her age is 14.
 Laurel is the mechanic for the Sirens.Her age is 12.
 Nemo is the G.E.N.I.E. for the Sirens. They power the drone Nautilus.

The Cold Kings
 Manta is the pilot for the Cold Kings. Their drone is part of Teach Tech and it's called Sub-Zero. His age is 15.
 Shino is the enginerd/mechanic for the Cold Kings. They're representing Polaris Academy in the drone racing competition. His age is 14.

Teach Tech
 Gavinda Teach is the owner and founder of Teach Tech, a tech manufacturing company that creates drones which are powered by nucleum, an element that is toxic to the environment.

Other
 Big Moe is Mouse's father and the leader of the Ruto Clan.

Voice artists

English
Jet Walker as Corto
Soso Bianchi as Mouse
Ogie Banks as Enki
Cedric L. Williams as Adam, Deejay and Shino
Ryan Colt Levy as Manta
Tiana Camacho as Debbie, Hannah, Laurel and Max
Bill Butts as Big Moe

French 
 Gabriel Bismuth-Bienaimé as Enki
 Caroline Combes
 Anaïs Delva as Corto
 Hervé Grull
 Leslie Lipkins
 Olivia Luccioni-Dassin
 Kelly Marot
 Julien Meunier
 Bruno Méyère
 Marie Nonnenmacher
 Stéphane Roux
 Thomas Sagols

German 
 Luisa Wietzorek as Corto 
 Nicolas Rathod as Enki
 Sarah Tkotsch as Mouse
 Gerald Schaale as Wyatt Whale
 Fabian Krüger as Oro
 Sophie Lechtenbrink as Hannah
 Carlos Fanselow as Shark
 Andrea Cleven as Flora
 Marie Isabel Walke as Mina
 Fabian Heinrich as Jay Dee

Episodes

Broadcast

External links
 
 Official Website

2020s French animated television series
2020 French television series debuts
2021 French television series endings
French children's animated adventure television series
French children's animated drama television series
French children's animated fantasy television series
Anime-influenced Western animated television series
Disney animated television series